Lorenzo Landi (1567 – 12 December 1627) was a Roman Catholic prelate who served as Bishop of Fossombrone (1612–1627).

Biography
Lorenzo Landi was born in Velletri, Italy in 1567.
On 4 July 1612, he was appointed during the papacy of Pope Paul V as Bishop of Fossombrone.
On 29 July 1612, he was consecrated bishop by Giovanni Garzia Mellini, Cardinal-Priest of Santi Quattro Coronati, with Ottavio Accoramboni, Bishop Emeritus of Fossombrone, and Paolo De Curtis, Bishop Emeritus of Isernia, serving as co-consecrators. 
He served as Bishop of Fossombrone until his death on 12 December 1627.

Episcopal succession
While bishop, he was the principal co-consecrator of:
Ottavio Ridolfi, Bishop of Ariano (1612); 
Francesco Cennini de' Salamandri, Bishop of Amelia (1612); 
Francesco Diotallevi, Bishop of Sant'Angelo dei Lombardi e Bisaccia (1614); and 
Girolamo Curlo, Bishop of Ventimiglia (1614).

References

External links and additional sources
 (for Chronology of Bishops) 
 (for Chronology of Bishops) 

17th-century Italian Roman Catholic bishops
Bishops appointed by Pope Paul V
1567 births
1627 deaths